Operation Alaska, Finalaska or New Finland was a proposed plan by some US officials to take Finnish refugees into Alaska if the Soviet Union would have conquered Finland. There were plans to take Finns into Alaska, both during the Winter War and the Continuation War. New Finland would have been established in Central Alaska around the Tanana River.

The plan was opposed by Alaskans, mainly because the Finnish language is difficult to learn and not commonly used in the region.

Background 
In the United States during the Winter War, a genocide of the Finns was feared, so it was proposed that America would save the Finns by evacuating them into Alaska. Alaska was chosen because it was thought to be suitable for Finnish people and because it had a very low population. During the Continuation War there was also a plan to take Finnish refugees, however on a larger scale, because America was ready to evacuate the whole Finnish population and a populated Alaska would have been better secured in the upcoming Cold War against Soviet offensives.

See also 
 The Slattery Report, a similar plan to move Jews fleeing Nazi-occupied Europe to Alaska.
 The Yiddish Policemen's Union (2007) by Michael Chabon, an alternate history novel set in a world where the Slattery Report was implemented.

References 

Finland–United States relations
Finland in World War II
History of Alaska
History of Finland
Settlement schemes in the United States
United States home front during World War II